Mary: The Making of a Princess is an Australian television film produced for Network Ten. It premiered on Network Ten on 15 November 2015.

Cast
 Emma Hamilton – Mary Donaldson
 Ryan O'Kane – Prince Frederik
 Gig Clarke – Andrew Miles 
 Renae Small – Amber 
 Nicholas Hope – Per Thornitt 
 Gareth Reeves – Prince Joachim
 Alin Sumarwata – Princess Alexandra
 James Lugton – John Donaldson
 Shane Briant – Prince Henrik
 Leah Purcell – Toni Klan 
 Angela Punch McGregor – Queen Margrethe

References

External links

Network 10 original programming
2010s Australian television miniseries
2015 Australian television series debuts
2015 Australian television series endings
2015 television films
2015 films